The Naden Band of the Royal Canadian Navy is one of six regular force military bands of the Canadian Forces.  The Royal Canadian Navy band is based at CFB Esquimalt in Esquimalt, British Columbia that serves as the official musical unit of the Canadian Forces Maritime Forces Pacific Command (MARPAC).

History

It was established in August 1940 eight months following the establishment of the Stadacona Band of Maritime Forces Atlantic. Known originally as the HMCS Naden Band, it was formed from auditioned in Victoria and Vancouver. It was dissolved in 1994 as a result of a federal reorganization of Canadian military bands. For three years, a small group of Regular Force musicians augmented by volunteers formed the HMCS Malahat Band, and filled the void by providing musical support for MARPAC. After public outcry occurred, the Minister of National Defence ordered the recreation of the band in 1997. On Victoria Day in 2013, the band unveiled 5 percussionist at the front of the band that would form the permanent corps of drums. The longest serving member of the band is Petty Officer Second Class Michael Savich, who served for 41 years from 1976 to 2017.

Notable performances
In the decades following World War II, Naden Band continued to represent the Canadian Forces throughout British Columbia and Canada, receiving fame for its performances at events such as the Pacific National Exhibition, Klondike Days, the Grey Cup and the Calgary Stampede and the opening of the Legislative Assembly of British Columbia.

Timeline
1958 – British Columbia Centennial
1972 – It accompanied the 2nd Canadian Destroyer Squadron in a tour of Australia, Fiji, and New Zealand.
Salvation Army Christmas Concerts (annually since 1979)
Expo 70 in Osaka, Japan 
Visit to Vladivostok, Russian SFSR in 1991
September 2010 – Canadian Naval Centennial Tattoo
2012 – International Military Band Concert at Joint Base Lewis–McChord
7 July 2013 – Pacific Tattoo
19 August 2017 – 75th anniversary parade of the Dieppe Raid in Dieppe, France
November–December 2018 – Represent the RCN at the bicentennial celebrations of the Chilean Navy.
6 June 2019 – 75th anniversary ceremony of the D-Day landings

References

External links
Official Website
The Naden Band of Maritime Forces Pacific performing at the Ceilidh March 1st 2008
The Naden Band on Shaw TV - Victoria 
Naden Band returns to perform at the Okanagan Military Tattoo - 2017
The Naden Band of Maritime Forces Pacific performs at The Bay Centre

Bands of the Royal Canadian Navy
Musical groups established in 1940
1940 establishments in Canada
Musical groups from British Columbia